Anatol Leonid Fürst von Lieven, (1872 – 1937) was a Baltic German prince of the Lieven family who commanded a counter-revolutionary White movement during the Russian Civil War in Latvia known after him as the Liventsy.

Biography
Anatol von Lieven was born on November 16, 1872 in St. Petersburg, Russia. He had studied law in the University of St. Petersburg but later was admitted into the  where he graduated with the rank of podporuchik.
From 1896 until 1908 he served as an officer in the Cavalry Guards regiment. In 1908 he left the army and traveled to Courland where his family owned several manors. Until the First World war he owned and lived in the Mežotne Palace near Bauska. When the war started he returned to active service in his cavalry regiment and in 1917 was granted the rank of rotmistr (cavalry captain).

After the October Revolution, he returned to Latvia and in December 1918, arrived in Liepāja. In January 1919, he started the formation of Liepāja volunteer rifleman unit. Core of the newly established unit was 60 officers of the Russian Imperial army. Soon, this unit was complemented with one company of Baltische Landeswehr and one company under the command of captain Didorov. The unit became known as Līvenieši and it participated in the Latvian War of Independence fighting against the Bolsheviks.

During the pro-German coup in April 1919, Lieven refused to collaborate with the pro-German government. Later, his unit was incorporated into the Baltische Landeswehr and participated in battles around Ventspils, Jelgava and also the liberation of Riga. On 24 May 1919, Lieven was seriously wounded near Ropaži, the injury left him slightly lame for the rest of his life. On June 6, 1919, Lieven's unit was transformed to the Russian volunteer corps with around 4000 men. Lieven forbade his men to fight the Estonian Army and Northern Latvia brigade in Vidzeme, unlike the rest of the Baltische Landeswehr. His detachment only performed rear security duties for the Landeswehr during the campaign.

When the Strazdumuiža ceasefire was signed between the Baltische Landeswehr and Estonian army, Lieven transformed his corps into the West Russian Volunteer Army. Another two Russian units joined his army. Those were the partisan unit Cavalry General count Keller under command of Pavel Bermondt Avalov and infantry brigade under command of colonel Virgolitz. On 9 July, his army received an order from Nikolai Yudenich to move to Narva and join his northwest army's offensive on Petrograd. Pavel Bermondt Avalov and colonel Virgolitz refused to leave Latvia and stayed in Jelgava. Bermondt took over command of the army and during October–November 1919, and were defeated by the Latvian army.
Lieven went to Estonia and until December 1919, fought with Yudenich's army around Petrograd. He also traveled to London and Paris and tried to negotiate further military support to Yudenich, however unsuccessfully.

After the civil war, Lieven became a Latvian citizen and a manufacturer of bricks. Early in 1920, he returned to his Mežotne palace but soon traveled to France. He returned to Latvia in 1924; but meanwhile, Latvian agrarian reforms were launched and his Mežotne palace was seized by the government and his lands divided. However, he was granted a small manor nearby Mazmežotne manor, and he lived there and also in Riga for the rest of his life. Later, he established the Mazmežotne brick factory. He was also active in the anticommunist movement and led a local detachment of the Brotherhood of Russian Truth.

Anatoly von Lieven died on April 3, 1937 in Ķemeri, Latvia. He was buried in the yard of the Mežotne lutheran church.

References

1872 births
1937 deaths
Baltic-German people
Baltische Landeswehr personnel
Lieven family
People from Liepāja
People from Sankt-Peterburgsky Uyezd
Russian military personnel of World War I
People of the Russian Civil War
Russian anti-communists
White movement people
Military personnel from Saint Petersburg